Roxana Brusso (born November 19, 1978) is a Peruvian/American actress. She is more known for her roles as Detective Alicia Fernández in Southland, and Sheri Strepling in Touch.

Biography

Roxana Brusso was born in Lima, Peru with a Peruvian, Italian, and Spanish background. When she was four years old, her family moved to the United States, and she grew up in North Hollywood, California. She became interested in an acting career in college.

After that, she has appeared in several television series like Melrose Place, Beverly Hills 90210, Crossing Jordan, Without a Trace, ER, and NCIS, among others.

In 2007, she landed a recurring role as Maria on the short lived ABC series Dirty Sexy Money. After the show was cancelled, Brusso went on another recurring role as Detective Alicia Fernández on TNT's cop drama Southland. In 2012, she also started appearing on Fox's series Touch.

Filmography

Film

Television

References

External links
 Roxana Brusso Website

1978 births
Living people
American television actresses
Peruvian emigrants to the United States
21st-century American women
Actresses from Lima
American people of Italian descent
American people of Spanish descent
American people of Peruvian descent